is a private university in Aichi Prefecture, Japan. Its campuses are located in Nakamura-ku, Nagoya, Toyohashi and Higashi-ku, Nagoya.

History
The school produced numerous leaders who took part in China's modernisation process in the early 20th century, with financial and intellectual support from Japan.

At the end of World War II, the university faced closure. Its spiritual successor, Aichi University, was established by staff and students who had previously been based at the university and other overseas Japanese institutions in Toyohashi, Japan in 1946.

Chronology
 1901: Toa Dobunshoin is established in Shanghai, China by Konoe Atsumaro.
 1939: Toa Dobunshoin is promoted to university status.
 1945: Toa Dobunshoin University closes in the wake of Japan's defeat in World War II.
 1946: Aichi University is established as an old-style university by teaching staff and students of the now defunct Toa Dobunshoin University.
 1947: Toyohashi campus opens. Faculty of Law and Economics is established.
 1949: Chartered as a new-style university. Faculty of Letters is established.
 1951: Kurumamichi campus opens. Community Research Institute is established at the Toyohashi campus.
 1959: Women's Junior College is established.
 1968: First edition of Aichi University's "Comprehensive Chinese-Japanese Dictionary" is published, the first ever comprehensive Chinese-Japanese dictionary.
 1988: Miyoshi, Aichi campus opens.
 1989: The Faculty of Economics and Law is reorganized. The Faculty of Law, Faculty of Economics and Faculty of Business Administration are established in its place.
 1997: Faculty of Modern Chinese Studies is established.
 1998: Faculty of International Communication is established.
 2004: Kurumamichi campus is rebuilt. Graduate School of Law is established.
 2006: Confucius Institute is established at Aichi University. Graduate School of Accounting is established.
 2011: Faculty of Regional Policy is established.
 2012: Nagoya campus is opened in the Sasashima Live 24 District by Nagoya Station. Miyoshi, Aichi campus closes. University headquarters and Graduate School moved to Kurumamichi campus.

Organization

Undergraduate programs 
 Faculty of Law (Department of Law)
 Faculty of Economics (Department of Economics)
 Faculty of Business Administration (Department of Business Administration; Department of Accounting and Finance)
 Faculty of Modern Chinese Studies (Department of Modern Chinese Studies)
 Faculty of International Communication (Department of English Studies; Department of Comparative Culture)
 Faculty of Letters (Department of Humanities and Sociology)
 Faculty of Regional Policy (Department of Regional Policy)

Graduate programs 
 Department of Law
 Department of Economics
 Department of Business Administration
 Department of Chinese Studies
 Department of International Communication
 Department of Humanities
 Graduate School of Law

Research centers 
 Institute of International Affairs
 Managerial Research Institute
 Comprehensive Chinese-Japanese Dictionary Editorial Center
 International Center for Chinese Studies
 Community Research Institute
 Research Institute of Industry in Chubu District
 Toa Dobunshoin University Memorial Center
 San-En-Nanshin Center for Regional Cooperation

Pass rate for bar exam 
Aichi Law School (Graduate School of Law) was 8th out of all the 74 law schools in Japan according to the ratio, 64.36%, of the successful graduates who passed the bar examinations from 2007 to 2017 on average.

In 2006 and 2009, Aichi Law School became 1st out of all the private university law schools in Japan and 1st out of all the law schools in Japan regarding pass rate for bar exam in 2020 and 2021 consecutively.

References

External links 

 Aichi University website (Japanese)
 Aichi University website (English)
 Aichi University Facebook page
 Aichi University: Project for Promotion of Global Human Resources Development Page
 Aichi University: Project for Promotion of Global Human Resources Development Blog

Educational institutions established in 1901
Private universities and colleges in Japan
Aichi University
1901 establishments in Japan
Toyohashi